Clarbeston Road railway station serves villages such as Clarbeston Road, Clarbeston, Wiston, Walton East and Crundale in Pembrokeshire, Wales. The station, originally named Clarbeston, was opened by the South Wales Railway on 2 January 1854.

History
A direct route to Fishguard Harbour – the Clarbeston Road and Letterston Railway (CR&LR) – was opened by the Great Western Railway on 30 August 1906, and the station at Clarbeston was renamed Clarbeston Road. As part of the CR&LR works, a number of improvements were made to the west of the station for the anticipated increase in goods traffic, but the passenger facilities were not altered because it was intended that  would continue to serve as the junction station.

The signal box west of the station now supervises not only the junction between the two routes but also both branches to their respective termini, all of the other boxes on both lines having been closed as part of a 1988 re-signalling scheme that saw control centralised here and colour light signals replace the surviving semaphores.

Facilities

Clarbeston Road is an unstaffed station, with shelters, timetable posters and digital information screens on each platform; there is also a customer help point on platform 2 and a public telephone near platform 1. The platforms are linked via ramps from the adjacent road bridge (so are accessible for disabled passengers, though the eastbound ramp is quite steep and care must be taken when using it). Trains stop here by request only.

Services
The branch line to/from  diverges here with six direct services each way – three morning, two evening, one night – calling at the station each day Monday to Saturday. There is no direct service on Sundays. While the station serves as a request stop to/from Milford Haven, trains to/from Fishguard Harbour stop here normally.

InterCity 125 services ran through Clarbeston Road to Milford Haven until the early 1990s, ceasing in 1994.

References

External links 

Railway stations in Pembrokeshire
DfT Category F2 stations
Former Great Western Railway stations
Railway stations in Great Britain opened in 1854
Railway stations served by Transport for Wales Rail
Railway request stops in Great Britain
1854 establishments in Wales